The 2022 Women's Asian Squash Team Championships was the 21st edition of Asian women's team championship for squash players. The event was held at Cheongju International Squash Stadium in Cheongju, South Korea, from 31 October to 4 November 2022.

Participating teams and seeds

Group stage

Pool A

Pool B

Second round

Fifth to eighth places

5th-8th semifinals

7th place playoff

5th place playoff

Knockout stage

Semifinals

Final

Final rankings 

Source:

Draws: 

Matches: 

Players: 

Result:

See also
 Asian Team Squash Championships
 2022 Men's Asian Squash Team Championships

References 

2022 in squash
Squash in Asia
International sports competitions hosted by South Korea
Squash tournaments in South Korea
2022 in South Korean sport